The Molson Coors Beverage Company is an Canadian-American multinational drink and brewing company incorporated under Delaware General Corporation Law and headquartered in  Golden, Colorado and Montreal, Quebec.

Molson Coors was formed in 2005 through the merger of Molson of Canada, and Coors of the United States.

In 2016, Molson Coors acquired the full global brand portfolio of Miller Brewing Company for approximately US$12 billion. The agreement made Molson Coors the world's third largest brewer at the time.

Molson Coors is a publicly traded company on both the New York Stock Exchange and Toronto Stock Exchange. Molson Coors has been a constituent of the S&P500 since 2005.

History 
On July 22, 2004, the Adolph Coors Company and Molson, Inc. announced their plan to merge. The merger was completed February 9, 2005, with the merged company being named Molson Coors Brewing Company. The merger including the brands and brewing operations of the Molson Brewery and the Coors Brewing Company. Molson Brewery was started by John Molson in Montreal, Canada in 1786. Coors Brewing Company was started by Adolph Coors in Golden, Colorado, United States in 1873.

Molson Coors bought Creemore Springs Brewery on April 22, 2005.

The operations of Molson Coors in Brazil were sold to the Mexican group FEMSA in 2006, and the beer operations of FEMSA was acquired by Heineken International in 2010.

Joint venture with SABMiller 
On October 9, 2007, SABMiller and Molson Coors Brewing Company announced a joint venture to be known as MillerCoors for their U.S. brewing and sales operations. SABMiller had 58% stake in the company, and Molson Coors had a 42% stake. MillerCoors combined their operations within North America with the headquarters in Chicago .

European acquisitions 
On February 2, 2011, the company purchased Sharp's Brewery of Cornwall in England for £20 million.

In early 2012 the company expanded into the Central and Eastern Europe markets by acquiring the region's market-leading brewery StarBev from CVC Capital Partners.

Miller acquisition 
In September 2015 Anheuser-Busch Inbev announced that it had reached agreement to acquire competitor SABMiller for $107 billion. During the merger discussions between the two companies in 2015, the U.S. Department of Justice (DOJ) had agreed to the proposed deal only on the basis that SABMiller "spins off all its MillerCoors holdings in the U.S. — which include both Miller- and Coors-held brands — along with its Miller brands outside the U.S."

SABMiller agreed to divest itself of the Miller brands by selling its stake in MillerCoors to Molson Coors. The merger between Anheuser-Busch Inbev and SABMiller closed on October 10, 2016. The spinoff deal was completed on October 11, 2016. As per the agreement with the regulators, SABMiller sold to Molson Coors full ownership of the Miller Brewing Company brand portfolio.

After SABMiller divested itself of all interests in MillerCoors, Molson Coors became the largest brewer in North America

2020 rebranding and restructuring 
On October 30, 2019, the company announced it would change its name to Molson Coors Beverage Company as a part of a restructuring to take place in 2020. The name change would reflect the companies growing focus on beverages outside of the traditional beer and brewing offerings. Additionally, the company would retire the MillerCoors corporate brand name and reorganize its global business units into Molson Coors North America, headquartered in Toronto, and Molson Coors Europe, headquartered in Prague.

2020 Milwaukee campus shooting 

On February 26, 2020, six people, including the shooter, were killed at a shooting near the company's Milwaukee brewing campus. The Milwaukee complex serves as a site for some of  Molson Coors' corporate offices and brewing facilities and was in the "Miller Valley" area, which served as the headquarters for the Miller Brewing Company before it was acquired by Molson Coors.

Joint venture with Yuengling 
On September 15, 2020, Molson Coors and D. G. Yuengling & Son announced a joint venture to oversee the expansion of Yuengling beer into states beyond its existing footprint. Under the terms of the deal, Yuengling beers will be brewed and packaged in select Molson Coors’ breweries under Yuengling brewers’ supervision, and distributed into new markets.

Operations
The company brews, markets and sells the Molson Coors portfolio of brands. Molson Coors operates breweries across the world, including the Molson Brewery in Montreal, Quebec, Blue Moon Brewing Company in Denver, Colorado, Borsodi Brewery in Bőcs, Hungary, Coors Brewery in Golden, Colorado, Creemore Springs Brewery in Creemore, Ontario, Fraser Valley Brewery in Chilliwack, British Columbia, Leinenkugel Brewery in Chippewa Falls, Wisconsin, Miller Brewery in Milwaukee, Wisconsin, Pardubice Brewery in Pardubice, Czech Republic, and the Staropramen Brewery in Prague, Czech Republic.

Corporate structure
Molson Coors operates through its business units Molson Coors North America and Molson Coors Europe.

Management team
As of May 2022, the management consisted of the following:

 Gavin Hattersley, President/Chief Executive Officer
 Adam Collins, Chief Communication and Corporate Affairs  
 Sergey Yeskov, President and CEO of Molson Coors Europe
 Kevin Doyle, President of U.S. Sales and Distributor Operations
 Brian Erhardt, Chief Supply Chain Officer 
 Rahul Goyal, Chief Strategy Officer 
 Tracey Joubert, Chief Financial Officer 
 Fred Landtmeters, President, Molson Coors Canada 
 Pete Marino, President of Emerging Growth 
 Dave Osswald, Chief People and Diversity Officer 
 Anne-Marie D’Angelo, Chief Legal and Government Affairs Officer 
 Michelle St. Jacques, Chief Marketing Officer

Brands

Notable brands include Blue Moon, Carling, Coors Banquet, Coors Light, George Killian's Irish Red, Granville Island Brewing, Hamm's, Hop Valley, Leinenkugel's, Miller High Life, Miller Lite, Milwaukee's Best, Molson Canadian, Molson Export, Steel Reserve, Terrapin, Vizzy Hard Seltzer a Staropramen.

Environmental record
Molson Coors conducted a comprehensive, and voluntary investigation of its pollution and environmental emissions. Coors was not violating the Clean Air Act but was encouraged by the Environmental Audit Privilege and Voluntary Disclosure Act which immunizes and credits organizations for conducting environmental self-audits, which can grant immunity from environmental regulation fines.

The United States government had thought that Coors was a minor violator of emissions such as volatile organic compounds (VOCs), but the investigating showed otherwise, revealing that Coors was 17 times over the estimated value of emissions.  Molson Coors then provided the audit results to the Colorado Department of Health which culminated in a $1.05 million fine for the 189 violations of state pollution laws.

Although Molson Coors said they did not know about the volatile organic compounds they were emitting, they do claim to be environmentally aware. Coors invented a new printing technology technique which uses ultra-violet light to cure the print, a technique which the company claims is more environmentally sound than the traditional gas firing technique. Coors has also incorporated a quarterly Supplier Quality Scorecard for their growers which tracks sustainable performance metrics such as  emissions, energy consumption, and water consumption.

In an in-depth analysis of the climate change "countermovement", the Coors Affiliated Foundation was listed among the top donors, having funded roughly 1% (US$6.2 million) of all climate denial research conducted between 2003 and 2010.

References

External links

 
Beer brewing companies based in Colorado
Breweries in Canada
Companies listed on the New York Stock Exchange
Food and drink companies established in 2005
Manufacturing companies based in Colorado
Multinational breweries
Companies based in Golden, Colorado